The Idol (Spanish: El ídolo), is a 2018 Mexican comedy film directed by Erwin Neumaier, and written by Daniel Weisberg. The plot revolves around Tomás Inclán (Francisco de la Reguera), a young musician who tries to make his sound creations recognized nationally and internationally. The film was presented in March 2018 at the Guadalajara International Film Festival.

Cast 
 Francisco de la Reguera as Tomás Inclán
 Roman Diaz as Guido
 Claudia Ramírez as Natasha
 Danae Reynaud as 	Recepcionista Dark
 Usla Haniel as Lorena
 Camila Selser as Julia

References

External links 
 

2010s Spanish-language films
Mexican comedy films
2018 comedy films
2010s Mexican films